Strike Back: Vendetta (sometimes referred to as Strike Back: The Final Season) is a ten-part British-American action television series, and serves as the eighth and final series of Strike Back. The series features returning cast members Daniel MacPherson, Warren Brown, Alin Sumarwata, Jamie Bamber and Varada Sethu. The series made its premiere in 14 February 2020.

Vendetta takes place some time after the events of Revolution. Section 20 are given a mission to stop two brothers from unleashing a series of terrorist attacks against the West, but gradually uncover a conspiracy between Western intelligence agencies.

Cast
Section 20
Daniel MacPherson as Sergeant Samuel Wyatt, US Joint Special Operations Command
Warren Brown as Sergeant Thomas "Mac" McAllister, British Army (ex-United Kingdom Special Forces)
Alin Sumarwata as Lance Corporal Gracie Novin, Australian Army  Special Operations Command
Jamie Bamber as Colonel Alexander Coltrane, British Army, the commanding officer of Section 20
Varada Sethu as Lance Corporal Manisha Chetri, British Army

Law enforcement and government officials
 John Michie as Sir James Spencer, the Deputy Chief of MI6
 Jacob Fortune-Lloyd as Constable Yoni Spiegel, Israel Police
 Lorraine Burroughs as Carolyn Fortier, Senior Supervisor of the CIA Directorate of Operations
 Yasemin Allen as Katrina Zarkova, a former Captain within the FSB's Alpha Group  

Russian Military
 John Albasiny as Lieutenant Colonel Lev Kogan, Deputy Director of the Combined Armed Centre for Electronic Warfare
 Semir Krivić as Sebastian Levkin, Foreign Intelligence Service

Antagonists
 Goran Bogdan as Edon Demachi, the leader of the Demachi crime family
 Ivana Miličević as Arianna Demachi/Elena Stabokina, Edon's wife and the Demarchi family matriarch, who is also a deep-cover agent for Russia.
 Maxim Baldry as Loric Demachi, Edon and Arianna's son
 Tomi May as Jovan Nishani/Branko Hajrovic, a former Bosnian Serb Army officer and enforcer for the Demarchi family
 Alec Secareanu as Zayef Hiraji, a Bosnian Muslim terrorist, and Mahir's younger brother
 Bamshad Abedi-Amin as Mahir Hiraji, a Bosnian Muslim terrorist and Zayef's older brother
 Arty Froushan as Nadav Topal, a Palestinian drug dealer and taxi driver
 Daniel Donskoy as Danny Dahan, an Israeli drug runner
 Thomas Levin as Yada Haim, an Israeli crime boss and property developer
 Marjan Radanovich as Sluchevsky, a Russian sniper and assassin
 Yayan Ruhian as Kabul, a CIA asset tasked with assassinating Section 20 to cover up the agency's war crimes.

Episodes

References

2020 American television seasons
2020 British television seasons
E